The World League Against Alcoholism was organized by the Anti-Saloon League, whose goal became establishing prohibition not only in the United States but throughout the entire world. 

As ratification of the Eighteenth Amendment creating prohibition in the U.S. neared, Anti-Saloon leader Ernest Cherrington promoted creation of the World League Against Alcoholism. Created in 1919, the new organization cooperated with temperance groups in over 50 countries on six continents. It provided assistance including speakers and educational materials to advance an international temperance movement.

Just as the Anti-Saloon League opposed not only saloons but any consumption of alcohol, the World League Against Alcoholism not only sought to prevent alcoholism but any consumption of alcoholic beverages.

Following the repeal of prohibition in 1933, the Anti-Saloon League's fortunes fell dramatically and it found itself unable to continue supporting the World League Against Alcoholism.

Sources

 Cherrington, Ernest. America and the World Liquor Problem. Westerville, OH: American Issue Publishing Co., 1922.
 Odegard, Peter H. Pressure Politics: The Story of the Anti-Saloon League. NY: Columbia University Press, 1928.
 Westerville (Ohio) Public Library. Leaders: Ernest Cherrington. Westerville Public Library website.

World League Against Alcoholism
Organizations established in 1919
1919 establishments in the United States